James Methuen Graham FRSE FRCSEd, LLD (1882–1962) was a Scottish surgeon. He was President of the Royal College of Surgeons of Edinburgh for the period 1945 to 1947. He was also Senior President of the Royal Medical Society. He made considerable advances in the fields of blood transfusion and on the thyroid gland.

Life

He was the son of Captain Dugald Graham of the Northern Lighthouse Service and Fishery Board (based in Edinburgh. He was raised in a (then new) villa at 12 Wardie Avenue, off Ferry Road in the north of the city. He was educated at George Watsons College then studied medicine at Edinburgh University 1899 to 1904 graduating MB ChB. He was made a Fellow of the Royal College of Surgeons of Edinburgh in 1907.

In 1919 the college awarded him the Chiene Medal for his thesis on blood transfusion. He worked as Assistant Surgeon at the Edinburgh Royal Infirmary on Lauriston Place being promoted to Senior Surgeon in 1928. He also assisted at the Deaconess Hospital and lectured in Pathology at Edinburgh University.
He was Chairman of the Edinburgh University Postgraduate Board for nine years.

In middle age he lived at 6 Castle Terrace, a fine terraced house facing directly onto Edinburgh Castle and the Castle Rock. In 1938 he was elected to the Aesculapian Club of Edinburgh. 
In 1944 he was elected a Fellow of the Royal Society of Edinburgh. His proposers were Sir John Fraser, Sir Andrew Davidson, Sir Sydney Smith and Alexander Dron Stewart.

At this time he lived at 8 Manor Place in Edinburgh's West End.

He died on 13 March 1962.

Artistic Recognition

His portrait, by Stanley Cursiter is held in the Royal College of Surgeons of Edinburgh.

References

1882 births
1962 deaths
Fellows of the Royal Society of Edinburgh
20th-century British medical doctors
Alumni of the University of Edinburgh
Academics of the University of Edinburgh
Presidents of the Royal College of Surgeons of Edinburgh